Elethyia subscissa is a moth in the family Crambidae. It was described by Hugo Theodor Christoph in 1877. It is found in Turkmenistan.

References

Ancylolomiini
Moths described in 1877